We Still Crunk!! is the second studio album by Lil Jon & the East Side Boyz.

Track listing
 "We Still Crunk"
 "I Like Dem Girlz" (featuring Jazze Pha)
 "Where Dem Girlz At?" (featuring Skyy)
 "Bounce Dat Ass" (featuring 6 Shot & Chyna Whyte)
 "Let My Nuts Go" (featuring Too Short & Quint Black)
 "Bia' Bia'" (featuring Too Short & Chyna Whyte)
 "Da Maurier" (featuring VP)
 "Take 'Em Out" 
 "Uhh Ohhh" (featuring Khujo Goodie of Goodie Mob & Bohagon)
 "Put Yo Hood Up"
 "Move Bitch" (featuring Three 6 Mafia, YoungBloodZ, Chyna Whyte & Don Yute)
 "Fuck Security" (featuring Paine, Loko of Big Oomp Records, Intoxicated of Big Oomp Records, Chyna Whyte & Bizarre) 
 "Shut Down" (featuring Intoxicated & Loko)
 "I Like Dem Girlz Remix" (featuring Too Short & Chyna Whyte)
 "Bia' Bia' Remix"(featuring Chyna Whyte, Ludacris & Too Short)
 "It Ain't Over"
 "We Don't Need That" (featuring Bohagon)

Chart awards

Singles
"I Like Dem Girlz"

"Put Yo Hood Up"

References

2000 albums
Lil Jon & the East Side Boyz albums
Albums produced by Lil Jon